Samuel Cahill (24 July 1844 – 25 October 1910) was an American Roman Catholic Jesuit priest and academic. He served as President of the College of the Holy Cross from 1887 to 1889.

Biography

Early life and education 
Cahill was born in Ireland on 24 July 1844 but moved to the United States with his parents as a young child. He entered the Society of Jesus in 1868 at Frederick, Maryland. He studied philosophy and theology at Woodstock College and was ordained to the priesthood by Archbishop James Gibbons in 1880.

Career and later life 
Cahill spent his early priesthood serving in parishes, including St. Ignatius Church in Baltimore.

Cahill held a series of administrative posts at Loyola College (now Loyola University Maryland), Saint Joseph's College (now Saint Joseph's University), Fordham University, and Boston College. In 1887, he was appointed President of the College of the Holy Cross, but resigned only two years later due to ill health. He went for health purposes to Colorado and New Mexico, where he worked as a laborer until 1897.

In 1905, he was appointed Vice President of Georgetown University, while at the same time working at Holy Trinity Church in Washington, D.C. His last appointment was Pastor of St. Joseph's Church in Philadelphia, Pennsylvania, where he died on 25 October 1910.

References 

1844 births
1910 deaths
19th-century American Jesuits
20th-century American Jesuits
Irish emigrants to the United States (before 1923)
Presidents of the College of the Holy Cross
Georgetown University people